Timecop is a side-scrolling action video game produced by Cryo Interactive for the Super Nintendo Entertainment System in 1995. It is based on the 1994 film of the same title and takes place after the events of the film. Despite the use of digitized actors to portray the characters in the game,  Jean-Claude Van Damme was not used to pose as protagonist Max Walker. Levels range from locales in the past (e.g., New York City during the 1920s, the European front of World War II), the present day, and a dystopian Los Angeles of the distant future.

Although the game was only released for the Super NES, a version was also developed for the Sega CD, with a short demo being distributed in May 1995 alongside the European Sega Pro magazine. Despite being fully completed by the developer, JVC pulled off the Sega CD version publishing and it remained unreleased. In 2007, a complete version of the game was eventually released on the Internet by the Sega CD version coder.

Gameplay

Players must stop the original inventor of time travel, Dr. Hans Kleindast, and must fix all the wrong things that Kleindast does in the game. There are 15 levels in all; most of them are standard platforming levels. Some levels involve the use of a player-controlled vehicle and use of martial arts.

A time limit is in effect for all 15 levels of the game; resulting in instant death and the loss of a life if the timer reaches 0:00.

Reception
On release, Famitsu magazine scored the game a 20 out of 40. GamePro panned the game, citing exaggerated animation, lack of digitized voice, and almost unplayable design. Allgame gave the game a 2.5 out of 5 score.

The game is popular among the Games Done Quick speedrunning community as part of their "Awful Games Done Quick" block, where they provide humorous commentary on various aspects of the video game.

References

1995 video games
Cancelled Sega CD games
Cryo Interactive games
Dystopian video games
Science fiction video games
Super Nintendo Entertainment System games
Super Nintendo Entertainment System-only games
Video games about police officers
Video games about time travel
Video games based on films
Video games based on Dark Horse Comics films
Video games based on comics
Video games based on adaptations
Video games with digitized sprites
Video games developed in France
Timecop (franchise)
Video games set in Europe
Video games set in Los Angeles
Video games set in New York City